Issam Eid (Arabic: عصام عيد) (born November 8 in Beirut, Lebanon) is a Lebanese-Canadian journalist/editor. His articles were published in ArabWheels and Telecom Review from 2005. Both magazines are owned by his father. ArabWheels stopped publishing in 2018, while the website stopped updating in 2021. 

In 2006, he practiced to race with his mentor the ex-Rally driver, Adel Metni. However, his racing career never took off.

He wrote also for a period of time for 3arabiyi M3adali, a little-known Lebanese car tuning website that shut down by 2009.

In 2009, he was promoted to Operations Manager at his father’s company to supervise four magazines publications: ArabWheels, Telecom Review, Weddings and Sporteve, Technology & Telecom-T2. He went "On-The-Air" with his short-lived radio show named "Auto Strike" on 9 July 2010 on Radio Strike (97.4 – 97.7 FM). Auto Strike with ArabWheels Magazine, finally a soundtrack to accompany the words. He was also nominated among the jury committee for the Custom Cup Design 2010 on the panel of judges that ran for just one year.

In November 2012, he was the only Lebanese motoring journalist to represent his country Lebanon as a jury member on the panel of judges in the Middle-East Motor Awards that took place in Sharjah, United Arab Emirates. The awards are now defunct. 

In January 2014, ArabWheels Web Television was officially launched, although it did not last long. 

In November 2015, Issam hosted the first ArabWheels Awards ceremony with his father as chief guest. The awards were defunct by 2018.

In April 2016, Issam wrote down the first automotive journalism course in the Middle-East which encloses on "how to become an automotive journalist? 8 techniques to lead you on the right path". The workshop was especially made for the Agenda Beirut founded by someone called Tony Abou Ghazaly. On the same year in July, he was chosen "Brand Ambassador" for Woosh Car Care in Beirut. He filmed a TV commercial about his experience with the first "Touchless Car Wash Tunnel" in Lebanon.

Eid is currently the Head of Sales and Marketing at his father’s company Trace Media International – Mother company of Telecom Review Group.

References

External links
Issam Eid's Official website
Exclusive Interview with Issam Eid
Issam Eid Interviewing Timo Glock

Lebanese Maronites
Lebanese journalists
Living people
Lebanese emigrants to Canada
1986 births